The Württemberger Hymne or Württemberg Anthem is a Regionalhymne or regional song, for the German Federal state of Württemberg. 

The music for the song was composed for the Kingdom of Württemberg (1806–1918) by Peter Joseph von Lindpaintner.

The lyrics begin, "Von dir, o Vaterland, zu singen / Muß wahrer Liebe wohl gelingen."

References

Kingdom of Württemberg
German anthems
Historical national anthems
Swabia
European anthems
Songs about Germany